Lew Yih Wey (born 27 June 1991) is a Malaysian swimmer, who specialised in long-distance freestyle, backstroke, and individual medley events. She represented her nation Malaysia at the 2008 Summer Olympics, and has won a career total of four medals (one gold and three bronze) in a major international competition, spanning the 2007 Southeast Asian Games in Bangkok, Thailand.

Lew competed for the Malaysian swimming team in the women's 400 m individual medley at the 2008 Summer Olympics in Beijing. Three months before the Games, she produced a record-breaking effort and cleared a FINA B-cut of 4:50.52 to earn her Olympic debut at the Malaysian Open Championships in Bukit Jalil. Her winning time from the meet also erased the national mark of 4:51.01, set by Siow Yi Ting at the 2003 Southeast Asian Games in Hanoi, Vietnam. Swimming as the fastest entrant in heat one, Lew attempted to chase Singapore's Quah Ting Wen and 2004 Olympic finalist Nam Yoo-sun of South Korea at the final turn of the race, but could not catch them near the wall to finish only with a third-place time and thirty-fourth overall in 4:55.83, just more than five seconds outside her national record.

References

External links
NBC 2008 Olympics profile

1991 births
Living people
Olympic swimmers of Malaysia
Swimmers at the 2008 Summer Olympics
Malaysian female freestyle swimmers
Malaysian female backstroke swimmers
Malaysian female medley swimmers
People from Negeri Sembilan
Southeast Asian Games medalists in swimming
Southeast Asian Games gold medalists for Malaysia
Southeast Asian Games bronze medalists for Malaysia
Competitors at the 2007 Southeast Asian Games
21st-century Malaysian women